Baienfurt (Low Alemannic: Boeafurt) is a municipality in the district of Ravensburg in Baden-Württemberg in Germany.

Sister cities
 Brest, Belarus
 Martonvásár, Hungary
 Goito, Italy
 Pirna, Germany
 Remscheid, Germany

References

Ravensburg (district)